The 1999 Copenhagen Open was a men's tennis tournament played on carpet courts in Copenhagen, Denmark, that was part of the International Series of the 1999 ATP Tour. It was the twelfth edition of the tournament and was held 2–9 February 1998.

Finals

Singles

 Magnus Gustafsson defeated  Fabrice Santoro, 6–4, 6–1

Doubles

 Max Mirnyi /  Andrei Olhovskiy defeated  Marc-Kevin Goellner /  David Prinosil, 6–7(5–7), 7–6(7–4), 6–1

References

Copenhagen Open
Copenhagen Open
1999 in Danish tennis